Pavlov is a municipality and village in Žďár nad Sázavou District in the Vysočina Region of the Czech Republic. It has about 300 inhabitants.

Administrative parts
The hamlet of Starý Telečkov is an administrative part of Pavlov.

References

Villages in Žďár nad Sázavou District